The Presidents Cup has been held biennially since 1994. Initially, it was held in even numbered years, with the Ryder Cup being held in odd numbered years. However, the cancellation of the 2001 Ryder Cup due to the September 11 attacks pushed both tournaments back a year, and the Presidents Cup began being held in odd numbered years.  The COVID-19 pandemic led to the cancellation of the 2020 Ryder Cup, and the Presidents Cup is returning to being held in even numbered years as a consequence.

Coverage overview
CBS covered the first three Presidents Cups (1994, 1996 and 1998). Beginning in 2000, the American broadcast television rights moved over to NBC, which has held it ever since.

On the weekday cable side, ESPN like CBS covered the first three Presidents Cups. TNT then carried the Presidents Cup from 2000 to 2007; Golf Channel assumed those rights beginning with the 2009 event as part of its overall deal for PGA Tour cable rights.

Commentators

Play-by-play/anchors

Analysts

See also
List of PGA Tour on CBS commentators
List of ESPN/ABC golf commentators
List of NBC Sports golf commentators
Golf Channel#Notable personalities
Golf on TNT#Commentators

References

External links
Search Results for: Presidents Cup (Awful Announcing)

CBS Sports
Golf on NBC
Turner Sports
ESPN announcers
Broadcasters
Golf Channel
Lists of golf writers and broadcasters